Moscow in October is a 1927 Soviet silent historical drama film directed by Boris Barnet. The picture fared poorly at the box-office and with the critics. The film has been partially lost.

History
The film is timed to coincide with the 10th anniversary of the October Revolution and was withdrawn by order of the "October Jubilee Commission" under the Presidium of the Central Executive Committee of the USSR.

Particular attention was paid to the "part apparatus" Sergei Eisenstein, Vsevolod Pudovkin, Esfir Shub and Boris Barnet. But if Eisenstein's films - "Oktyabr", Pudovkina - "The End of St. Petersburg" and Shub - "The Great Way", became widely known, then Barnet's film was not very popular and was soon removed from the "big screen", made only a few copies of the film.

Despite a small rental in the USSR, special criticism from the press did not follow, as it was known - the script was agreed with ""Eastpart"" and was viewed not only by the commission responsible for the preparation of solemn events, but even at the next plenum of the Central Committee of the Soviet Union.

The film was not completely preserved: several parts were lost during the course of the Second World War.

Synopsis
The painting depicts the staged scenes of the October Bolshevik uprising in Moscow, as well previous events. The film begins with a scene of a meeting: people near the monument to Alexander Sergeevich Pushkin, intertitles: "After the July days there were uninterrupted rallies," which indicates July 1917. The film covers events from this date, right up to the creation Council of People's Commissars, headed by Lenin.

Cast
 Anna Sten
 Boris Barnet 
 Ivan Bobrov
 Aleksandr Gromov
 Vasily Nikandrov as Lenin

Notes

References

External links 
 
 

1927 films
1920s historical drama films
Soviet silent feature films
Soviet historical drama films
1920s Russian-language films
Films directed by Boris Barnet
Films about Vladimir Lenin
Lost Russian films
Soviet black-and-white films
1927 drama films
Russian black-and-white films
Russian historical drama films
Lost Soviet films
Silent historical drama films